Nyctia lunubris is a species of true flies in the family Sarcophagidae.

References

Sarcophagidae
Diptera of Europe
Insects described in 1843
Taxa named by Pierre-Justin-Marie Macquart